Sauli Rytky (June 6, 1918 in Haapavesi, Northern Ostrobothnia – January 28, 2006) was a Finnish cross-country skier who competed in the 1940s.

He was born in Haapavesi.

He won a silver medal at the 1948 Winter Olympics in St. Moritz in the 4 × 10 km relay.

Rytky also finished sixth in the 18 km event at the 1948 Winter Olympics.

Cross-country skiing results
All results are sourced from the International Ski Federation (FIS).

Olympic Games
 1 medal – (1 silver)

World Championships

References

External links
Finland's 1948 Winter Olympic medals 

1918 births
2006 deaths
People from Haapavesi
Finnish male cross-country skiers
Olympic cross-country skiers of Finland
Cross-country skiers at the 1948 Winter Olympics
Olympic silver medalists for Finland
Olympic medalists in cross-country skiing
Medalists at the 1948 Winter Olympics
Sportspeople from North Ostrobothnia
20th-century Finnish people